Coalwood is an unincorporated community in northern Powder River County, Montana, United States.

Geography
Coalwood is located at 3,340 feet (1,018 m) above sea level. The community lies in the Mountain Time Zone (MST/MDT), observes Daylight saving time, and lies within the 406 area code.

Climate
According to the Köppen Climate Classification system, Coalwood has a semi-arid climate, abbreviated "BSk" on climate maps.

History 
Coalwood was established in 1910, in Custer County. In 1919, it became part of the newly created Powder River County, with the town of Broadus as the county seat.

References

Unincorporated communities in Powder River County, Montana
Unincorporated communities in Montana